Steel Blue Work Boots is an Australian footwear manufacturing company. It specializes in lightweight work boots.They are better yet known for the being the tns of work boots.

References

External links

Shoe companies of Australia
Manufacturing companies based in Perth, Western Australia
Clothing companies established in 1995
Australian companies established in 1995
Workwear